Pakistan participated at the 1970 Commonwealth Games in Edinburgh, Scotland.

Medalists

Medals by sport

References

Pakistan at the Commonwealth Games
Nations at the 1970 British Commonwealth Games